The Kentucky State Capitol is located in Frankfort and is the house of the three branches (executive, legislative, judicial) of the state government of the Commonwealth of Kentucky. The building is listed on the National Register of Historic Places.

History

Previous buildings

From 1792 to 1830, two buildings were used as the capitol, both of which burned completely.

In 1830, another capitol was built and was used until 1910. During a bitterly contested 1899 state governor election, Democratic Party claimant William Goebel was assassinated at the capitol on his way to be inaugurated. The need for a larger building for a growing state government resulted in the replacement of that capitol building, which is now a museum operated by the Kentucky Historical Society.

Current 1910 building
In 1904, the Kentucky General Assembly chose Frankfort (rather than Lexington or Louisville) as the location for the state capital and appropriated $1 million for the construction of a permanent state capitol building, to be located in southern Frankfort. The official ground-breaking was August 14, 1905 and construction was completed in 1909 at a cost of $1,180,434.80. The building was dedicated on June 2, 1910.

The capitol was designed by Frank Mills Andrews, a distinguished and award-winning architect. He used the Beaux-Arts style and included many classical French interior designs. The staircases, for example, are replicas of those of the Opéra Garnier in Paris.

Between 1912 and 1963, five statues of historical figures from Kentucky were erected in the rotunda of the capitol.  The first was a bronze statue of Abraham Lincoln, which was donated in 1912. Statues of Henry Clay and Dr. Ephraim McDowell were added in 1930.  Both of these are the bronzed plaster models used for the bronze statues that represent Kentucky in the National Statuary Hall in the U.S. Capitol in Washington, D.C.  In 1936, a marble statue of Jefferson Davis, president of the Confederate States of America, was placed in the rotunda.  The statue of Davis was paid for by both donations and public funds, and erected under the auspices of the United Daughters of the Confederacy.  The Kentucky General Assembly voted to fund a bronze statue of Alben Barkley, former Vice President of the United States, and it was added to the rotunda in 1963.

In 2018, a plaque in front of the statue of Jefferson Davis, which referred to Davis as a "patriot" and a "hero", was removed by the Kentucky Historic Properties Commission.  On June 4, 2020, Governor Andy Beshear stated that he believed the statue of Davis should be removed. On June 13, 2020, the Kentucky Historic Properties Commission voted 11-1 to remove the statue from the Capitol. The Davis statue was to be moved to the Jefferson Davis Monument State Historic Site situated in Fairview, Kentucky, the birthplace of Davis.

In November 2022, a bronze statue of Nettie Depp by Amanda Matthews, Depp's great-great niece, was unveiled inside that capitol. It is the first permanent large-scale monument of a woman inside the state capitol. While Nettie's influence was not statewide, the Historic Properties Advisory Commission considered her a representative example of Kentucky women who achieved professional and personal success. The statue’s unveiling occurred in November 2022.

Layout

The main part of the Capitol has three floors. The first floor contains the offices of the governor (and his or her staff), lieutenant governor, secretary of state, and attorney general. It also features a rotunda with statues of famous Kentuckians and other exhibits, including Kentucky Women Remembered.

The rotunda contains four statues of notable historical figures from Kentucky. In the center of the rotunda stands a bronze statue of President Abraham Lincoln.  Three more statues line the walls of the rotunda: bronze statues of Henry Clay, Vice President Alben Barkley, and Dr. Ephraim McDowell.

The second floor contains the courtroom of the state Supreme Court, as well as the chambers of the justices. The state law library is nearby. The State Reception Room is also located on the second floor.

The chambers of the House of Representatives and Senate face each other on opposite ends of the third floor. Some high-level legislative offices (such as for the Speaker of the House and the President of the Senate) are also located there.

The Capitol also has a partial fourth floor which houses the galleries of the House and Senate, as well as a few offices for legislative committee staffers.

In addition, there is a partially buried basement level with mostly offices for clerks and maintenance personnel. However, it also contains a small gift shop and lunch counter as well as a tunnel to the neighboring Capitol Annex building. The Annex houses General Assembly committee rooms, General Assembly members offices and a cafeteria.

People who have lain in state in the Rotunda
 Rebecca Boone, wife of Daniel Boone, 1845
 Daniel Boone, explorer, 1845
 Joseph Clay Stiles Blackburn, United States Senator, 1918
 Augustus Owsley Stanley, Governor, 1958
 Tom Garrett, state senator, 1979
 Col. Harland Sanders, founder of Kentucky Fried Chicken, 1980
 A.B. "Happy" Chandler, Governor and United States Senator, 1991
 Bert T. Combs, Governor, 1991
 Thelma Stovall, Lt. Governor, 1994
 Lawrence W. Wetherby, Governor, 1994
 Wilson W. Wyatt, Lt. Governor, 1996
 Vic Hellard Jr., Executive Director of the Kentucky Legislative Research Commission, 1996
 Mary Louise Foust, State Auditor, 1999.
 Wendell P. Butler, Superintendent of Public Instruction, 2000
 Robert F. Stephens, Chief Justice of the Kentucky Supreme Court, 2002
 Kenny Rapier, State Senator, 2002
 Edward T. "Ned" Breathitt, Governor, 2003
 Louie B. Nunn, Governor, 2004
 William E. McAnulty Jr., Justice on the Kentucky Supreme Court, 2008
 Mike Haydon, Governor's Chief of Staff, 2012
 Wendell Ford, Governor and United States Senator, 2015
 Georgia Davis Powers, State Senator, 2016
 John Y. Brown Jr., Governor and business mogul, 2022

Security
The Capitol used to be completely open during normal business hours, and local residents often used the marble hallways for exercise (the Frankfort equivalent of "mall walking"). Currently, anyone without proper state credentials must go through a metal detector. Security for the complex is provided by officers from the Facilities Security Branch of the Kentucky State Police along with specifically assigned state troopers.

See also
Floral clock (Frankfort, Kentucky)
List of state and territorial capitols in the United States

Gallery

References

External links

 Official website of the Kentucky State Capitol
 Kentucky's State Capitols Kentucky Department for Libraries and Archives
 Kentucky Historical Society page on the Old State Capitol
 Kentucky Secretary of State

Government of Kentucky
State capitols in the United States
Government buildings in Kentucky
Government buildings with domes
Tourist attractions in Franklin County, Kentucky
Government buildings completed in 1905
Government buildings on the National Register of Historic Places in Kentucky
1905 establishments in Kentucky
National Register of Historic Places in Frankfort, Kentucky
Beaux-Arts architecture in Kentucky